Hisare is a village in the Karmala taluka of Solapur district in Maharashtra state, India.

Demographics
Covering  and comprising 388 households at the time of the 2011 census of India, Hisare had a population of 2074. There were 1081 males and 993 females, with 286 people being aged six or younger.

References

Villages in Karmala taluka